Central England Co-operative, trading as Central Co-op, is a regional consumer co-operative in the United Kingdom, based in Lichfield and which trades from over 400 sites across the English Midlands and East Anglia. The business is owned and democratically controlled by its members who can stand for election to the board and who also share in the society's profits. A proportion of the profits of the business are also invested in local community groups through its community dividend grants programme and its more than 60 member classes.

The Society's key businesses are its 260 foodstores and over 120 funeral directors which all trade using the 2008 version of The Co-operative brand. The co-operative also , 10 florists, three stonemasonry outlets, a coffin factory and crematorium; it has 1,731,005 members (including over 329,000 regular trading members) and 8,600 employees (figures as January 2017).

Registered under the Co-operative and Community Benefit Societies Act 2014, Central England Co-operative is the second largest independent retail co-operative in the UK and was formed in 2014 following the 2013 merger of the Anglia Regional and Midlands Co-operative societies. The society has a permanent seat on the board of Co-operatives UK; it is a corporate member of The Co-operative Group, the largest consumer co-operative in the world and the national buying group, Co-operative Federal Trading Services.

History
On 19 September 2013, it was announced that the boards of Anglia Regional Co-operative Society and Midlands Co-operative Society had agreed merger terms. Approved by members on 4 and 18 November, legal completion of the merger took place on 1 December, with the Anglia Society transferring engagements to Midlands Co-operative. On 15 January 2014, members of the merged society approved a change of name to Central England Co-operative effective from 25 January 2014.

In 2017, members of the small neighbouring Wooldale Co-operative Society in West Yorkshire voted to transfer engagements to Central England Co-operative. In November 2022 the Central England Co-operative rebranded as Central Co-op.

Anglia Regional Co-operative Society

Tracing its origins to 1876, Anglia Regional Co-operative was formed by the merger of the Greater Peterborough Regional and Anglia (formerly Waveney) co-operative societies in 1987. Headquartered in Peterborough, the Society principally traded in the eastern counties of Bedfordshire, Cambridgeshire, Norfolk and Suffolk, although it had gained wider outreach through the acquisition of co-operative department stores in Yorkshire and the South East of England.

Following divestment of the Westgate department store and AHF businesses to J E Beale and the UKs largest worker co-operative, Anglia Home Furnishings Holdings, in 2011, Anglia Co-operative operated 27 retail stores, eight petrol stations, 21 travel agents, three opticians, a hair salon and 29 funeral homes. At the time of merger with the Midlands Co-operative it had 405,134 members (including over 189,000 regular trading members) and 1,600 employees.

Midlands Co-operative Society

Tracing its origins to Derby in 1854, the Midlands Co-operative Society was formed by the merger of the Central Midlands and Leicestershire co-operative societies in 1997. Headquartered in Lichfield, the Society traded in the English counties of West Midlands, Warwickshire, Worcestershire, Staffordshire, Derbyshire, Leicestershire, Rutland, Nottinghamshire, Northamptonshire, Lincolnshire, West and South Yorkshire through two distribution centres.

Following the merger of Midlands Co-op Travel and The Co-operative Travel with the retail branches of Thomas Cook in 2012, the Midlands Co-operative operated 200 retail stores, 15 petrol stations, 22 post offices, nine florists, two motor car dealerships and 90 funeral homes. At the time of merger with Anglia Co-operative it was UK Co-operative of the Year with 1,005,474 members (including over 140,000 regular trading members) and 7,000 employees.

Trading
The Society's principal activities are retail, funeral and travel services, although it also has interests in opticians, coffin manufacture, florists and manages a significant investment property portfolio. It operates through a number of brands aligned with The Co-operative Group.

The Co-operative Food

Food retail is the Society's core business, generating around 70% of total turnover. A distribution centre in Leicester supplies 235 supermarkets and convenience stores and also provides a service to neighbouring Heart of England and Tamworth co-operative branches. 22 food stores contain a Post Office counter. All stores trade under the co-operative food brand.

Central England Co-operative also operates 25 petrol filling stations with some of these associated with the co-op's larger supermarkets. However the society also operates a number of stand alone petrol stations, five of which were acquired through the purchase of Shaws Petrolium in 2013.

On 29 July 2022, the Society will open its latest food store in the newly refurbished Wolverhampton railway station.

The Co-operative Travel

Central England Co-operative directly manages 21 former Anglia Co-operative travel shops, many of which are co-located in former Westgate premises. It is a full member of the Association of British Travel Agents and all of its holidays are ATOL protected.

Central England Co-operative previously had 3.5% stake in a joint venture travel agent called The Co-operative Travel, which was owned by The Co-operative Group and Thomas Cook Group. Involvement in the joint venture came to an end in 2016 when Central England Co-operative (along with The Co-operative Group) were bought out by Thomas Cook.

The Co-operative Funeralcare

Central England Co-operative operates over 120 funeral homes throughout the Midlands and East of England, many under the original private names. It is a member of the National Association of Funeral Directors and its funeral bond scheme is monitored by the Funeral Planning Authority. The society also operates five memorial masonry showrooms across its trading area and operates a coffin manufacturing business.

The Society owns Bretby Crematorium, set in woodland grounds adjacent to the A511 Leicester to Burton upon Trent road between Burton and Swadlincote.

The Co-operative Florist
Central England Co-operative operates 10 florists shops located throughout the former Midlands Co-operative trading area. The Co-operative Florist is a member of the Interflora florists online scheme.

Westgate Opticians
The Society has been providing general ophthalmic services for over 40 years, through branches in Peterborough, St. Neots and Hunstanton. Trading as Westgate Opticians, it carries out more than 200 eye examinations each week.

Former Businesses

The Co-operative Motor Group operated dealerships in Lincoln and Loughborough until the co-op's dealerships in Lincoln were sold and the Loughborough garage was closed during 2015.

Leicester Carriage Builders, a specialist vehicle building and conversion business, was formed in 1903 as Leicester Carriage Builders and Wheelwrights and began its association with the Society through the Leicestershire Co-operative in 1971. It is a member of the Vehicle Builders and Repairers Association. The business has converted vehicles for many purposes including mobile libraries, welfare vehicles and mobile 'walk in' post office vans. The business was closed during 2015.

Finances
In the last full year of trading, 2018/19, Central England Co-op recorded gross sales (excluding VAT) of £869.9m (£848.3m 2017/18) and a trading profit of £18.1m (£16.6m 2017/18). Operating profit of £11.9m, was lower than the prior year (2017/18: £16.6m). The society was able to pay its members a total of £3.5m (£3.7m 2017/18) in dividend and dividend bonus during the year. The Society also had net debt of £20.6m (£16.7m 2017/18) and a £109.8m (£179.6m 2017/18) pension deficit as at 26 January 2019. The Society's active membership was over 330,000. The highest paid director in 2018/19 was the former Chief Executive whose total earnings were £730,438 (£713,491 2017/18).

Values and Principles
Because of its co-operative structure, the Society has a set of values and principles which require the business to operate responsibly and to share its profits with its members and their communities. The focus of the societies community work focuses on the community dividend, member classes, its SENse to Aspire initiative and its charity partner but it is also involved with various other programmes as outlined below.

Community dividend
Each year the co-op distributes 1% of its profits to the communities in which it trades. The money is usually in the form of grants between £100 and £5000 to local groups, community projects and charities. During 2017, a total of £212,000 was distributed to 120 groups. In the first six years of the scheme more than £1 million has been distributed. Previous organisations which have received grant have included the Chesterfield Sea Cadets, the East Anglian Air Ambulance and a Cambridgeshire project to rehabilitate injured firefighters. Research by Co-operative News showed that in 2013 the amount given to the communities in which it trades in grants, donations and fund-raising by staff and members was equivalent to 8.7% of its pre-tax profits for the year.

Member Classes
Central England Co‑operative has over 60 member groups attended by a total of 2,290 members. Classes are open to all members include painting, sugarcraft, line dancing, keep fit classes and a wine circle.

SENse to Aspire
Though a partnership with a school for children with special educational needs (SEN), Selly Oak Trust School in Birmingham, the Central England Co-operative has been organising and providing work experience for children at the school in one of their food stores or florist shops. Historically, only 7% of children with SEN find paid employment after they have finished their education and this programme aimed to improve this prospect for the children by providing them with the skills that they need to get (and keep) a job. Between 2013 and 2015, 151 students took part in the scheme and the co-op is working towards offering paid employment to some of the participants. This compares with an average of 2 - 3 students in previous years. For this work the co-op was commended as a finalist for the 2015 Business in the Community Inspiring Young Talent Award.

Charity partner
Since 2012 the Central England Co-operative has been fund-raising for their staff-elected charity, the Newlife Foundation. The charity aims to provide specialist equipment for disabled and terminally ill children in the Midlands and East Anglia. Since the partnership began the co-op has raised over £1,000,000 for the charity.

Food banks
The co-op works with food banks within its trading area to provide food and support for individuals and families who are under severe financial pressure and are who suffering from 'food poverty'. The scheme operates by linking up food banks with local co-op food stores to raise awareness of how food banks can help people in financial distress through 'promotional days' and by encouraging customers and members to donate food from permanent collection bins within stores. It is expected that all food stores will be affiliated with a local food bank (where possible) by 2016.

Responsible trading
As a part of the Co-operative Retail Trading Group the co-op has been a champion of Fairtrade for many years and stocks a wide array of such products. The society also has food-sourcing commitments including the responsible sourcing of fish, free-range eggs and clear food-labelling. These commitments largely match those the commitments of The Co-operative Group, of whom the society is a corporate member.

As a regional food retailer the business has a number of commitments to local and regional sourcing with a range of products including ales, bakery produce, ciders, seasonal fresh produce, honey and oils available in the co-op's stores. The co-op has pledged that, by 2018, 5% of food revenue will be products which are sourced within the region in which the business trades.

Governance
The current governance arrangements have been in place since the merger of the Midlands and Anglia societies. Twelve board members are elected from the society's membership with three customer-member and one employee-member being elected from each constituency at any one time. Additionally, the society has two non-executive directors, with a search committee existing to find and co-opt suitable candidates with these being elected by members at the members meetings. The co-op ran its first online and postal election using the new system in April 2014, with all members who have held a £1 share for six months being eligible to vote.

Members meetings are held twice a year with both customer-members and employee-members being encouraged to attend. Meetings are held at a number of locations across the trading region of the society including Leicester, Stafford, Kettering and Birmingham. At these events members vote on various motions including the distribution on a portion of the trading surplus as the 'Member Dividend' and the 'Community Dividend'.

The society also has three Membership and Community Councils (MCCs) with each representing one of the three (East, Central and Western) constituencies. There are 36 seats on the councils with nine customer-member and three staff-member seats for each of the constituencies.

Membership

The Society operates a membership scheme which is branded in line with The Co-operative brand although it is run separately from that of The Co-operative Group. The scheme works through members collecting points on their purchases with any of the co-ops family of businesses and these points are converted into a share of the profits twice a year with members voting on the amount at the members meetings. In 2014 the share of the profit was equal to £1 per point (or 1% of food purchases).

Members of Central England Co-operative can also earn points when trading with other co-operative societies (such as The Co-operative Group and The Midcounties Co-operative) whereby their share of the profit in the other business is transferred to, and paid by, Central England Co-operative from the other co-op every 6 months. Conversely members of other societies can earn points whilst trading with Central England Co-operative as long as they present their membership card.

Table contents correct as of July 2015

Other activities
The Society supports a number of charities and invests a percentage of its trading profit in local communities. It also provides awards for fund-raising, community and charity and environmental projects. Members can apply for a grant to a local cause or charity that would benefit under the Making a Difference community dividend scheme.

The Co-operative Party

The following local party councils are funded by Central England Co-operative to organise political activity:

See also
British co-operative movement
Credit unions in the United Kingdom

References

External links
Central England Co-operative
The Co-operative Group
The Co-operative Party

Consumers' co-operatives of the United Kingdom
Supermarkets of the United Kingdom
Funeral-related companies of the United Kingdom
British companies established in 2014
Retail companies established in 2014
Companies based in Lichfield
2014 establishments in England